Clethra barbinervis, the Japanese clethra, is a species of flowering plant in the family Clethraceae. It is native to eastern Asia, where it is found in southern China, Korea, and Japan. Its natural habitat is in open mountain forests. It is a common species in Japan, and is often found in disturbed secondary forests.

Mature specimens have peeling bark. The bark is plain, blackish brown with twigs turning back. 

This plant has gained the Royal Horticultural Society's Award of Garden Merit. Though hardy in cultivation, it requires a sheltered location in temperate regions.

References

barbinervis
Flora of China
Flora of Eastern Asia
Plants described in 1846